Karen Mellor (born 6 May 1969) is a retired British swimmer.

Swimming career
Mellor competed in the women's 800 metre freestyle at the 1988 Summer Olympics. She represented England and won a silver medal in the 4 x 200 metres freestyle relay, at the 1986 Commonwealth Games in Edinburgh, Scotland. Four years later she represented England in the 400 metres and 800 metres freestyle, at the 1990 Commonwealth Games in Auckland, New Zealand. She also won the 1985 ASA National Championship in the 200 metres freestyle and was three times winner of the 400 metres freestyle in 1985, 1989 and 1990.

References

External links
 

1969 births
Living people
British female swimmers
Olympic swimmers of Great Britain
Swimmers at the 1988 Summer Olympics
Sportspeople from Great Yarmouth
Commonwealth Games medallists in swimming
Commonwealth Games silver medallists for England
Swimmers at the 1986 Commonwealth Games
Swimmers at the 1990 Commonwealth Games
20th-century British women
Medallists at the 1986 Commonwealth Games